John Edward Armand (11 August 1898–1974) was an English footballer who played in the Football League for Leeds United, Newport County and Swansea Town. Born in Sabathu, British India, Armand became the first oversees player for both Leeds and Swansea.

References

1898 births
1974 deaths
English footballers
Association football forwards
English Football League players
West Stanley F.C. players
Swansea City A.F.C. players
Ashton National F.C. players
Southport F.C. players
Newport County A.F.C. players
Scarborough F.C. players
Denaby United F.C. players
British people in colonial India